Marcel Dubois (27 August 1886 – 19 February 1955) was a Belgian wrestler. He competed in the men's Greco-Roman light heavyweight at the 1908 Summer Olympics. He also won a bronze medal at the heavyweight event at the 1906 Intercalated Games.

References

1886 births
1955 deaths
Belgian male sport wrestlers
Belgian male weightlifters
Olympic weightlifters of Belgium
Olympic wrestlers of Belgium
Weightlifters at the 1906 Intercalated Games
Wrestlers at the 1906 Intercalated Games
Wrestlers at the 1908 Summer Olympics
Place of birth missing
20th-century Belgian people